First Presbyterian Church Complex, also known as United Presbyterian Church, is a historic Presbyterian church located at Cortland in Cortland County, New York.  It was built in 1889-1890 and is a solid massed masonry building consisting of a central hip-roofed main block fronted by steeply pitched gable projections.  Major additions to the original church were completed in 1922 and 1958. The church features a stout, multi stage bell tower with a tall steeple and prominent cross on the spire.  Also on the property is a Queen Anne style manse completed in 1903.

It was listed on the National Register of Historic Places in 2002.

References

Churches on the National Register of Historic Places in New York (state)
Presbyterian churches in New York (state)
Churches completed in 1890
19th-century Presbyterian church buildings in the United States
Churches in Cortland County, New York
National Register of Historic Places in Cortland County, New York